The Lord Mayor of Cork is the head of Cork City Council and first citizen of Cork. The title was created in 1199 as Provost of Cork and changed to Mayor of Cork in 1273. It was elevated to Lord Mayor in 1900. The date of election is the beginning of June, and the term of office is one year. This is a list of Provosts, Mayors and Lord Mayors.

Provosts of Cork

Mayors of Cork

13th century

14th century

15th century

16th century

17th century

18th century

19th century

Lord Mayors of Cork

20th century

21st century

References

 
Cork
Lists of political office-holders in the Republic of Ireland
Mayors